Bishop's Stortford College is a private boarding and day school in the English public school tradition for more than 1,200 pupils aged 4–18, situated in a  campus on the edge of the market town of Bishop's Stortford, Hertfordshire, England.

As an "all-through" school, it is a member of both the Headmasters' and Headmistresses' Conference and the Independent Association of Preparatory Schools. It is also a founding member of the Bishop’s Stortford Educational Trust, a consortium of local primary and secondary schools, and currently the only such trust in the UK to involve both state and independent sectors.

The college head is Kathy Crewe-Read.

History
The college was founded in 1868 by a group of prominent East Anglian Nonconformists who wanted to establish a public school "in which Evangelical Nonconformists might secure for their boys, an effective and Christian education on terms that should not be beyond the reach of the middle class generally".

They approached the Bishop's Stortford Collegiate School, a non-sectarian school founded in 1850, and acquired the buildings, renaming it The Nonconformist Grammar School. It was inaugurated on 23 September 1868, with 40 pupils, including 17 boarders, under the headship of Rev Richard Alliott, who remained at the helm until his death in 1899.

Former star pupil Francis Young became second headmaster, in 1900. During his 31-year tenure the roll increased from just 90 pupils to nearly 400 and the school grew in reputation. Among Young's first acts were: renaming it the Bishop's Stortford College in 1901, to avoid confusion with the town's rival Grammar School; in 1902 taking over an existing school for boys aged 8–13 years, which became the new preparatory department; in 1903 introducing rugby; and in 1904 changing the school's status from private commercial ownership to publicly endowed. He also commissioned many of the campus's redbrick buildings designed in the arts and crafts style by architect and former pupil Herbert Ibberson, acquired the 100 acre sports fields and oversaw construction of the Memorial Hall, commemorating the Old Stortfordians who had died in the Great War.

The college changed status in 1945, from a direct grant school to fully independent public school. It celebrated its centenary in 1968 with a major building programme and a visit by HM Queen Elizabeth the Queen Mother, followed in 1969 with a book, Bishop’s Stortford College: A Centenary Chronicle.

September 1977 saw the first four girls admitted, and the following year the first girls' house, Young, opened. In 1995 the college became fully coeducational, appointed its first female deputy head, Wendy Bellars, and opened a new co-ed Pre-Prep day school. Since 2013 large parts of the college have been substantially redeveloped and expanded, including new premises for Alliott, Collett, Trotman and Rowe Houses, and an extension to the Prep School (during which workers excavated 2.5 tonnes of Hertfordshire puddingstone, one of the rarest rocks).

In the early hours of 29 September 2015 Robert Pearce boarding house was devastated by fire. Pupils and staff were evacuated safely but the building lost its roof and burned down to the bricks. It was renovated and reopened in January 2018, in time for the college's 150th anniversary, which was commemorated in the book, Bishop's Stortford College: Celebrating 150 Years 1868-2018.

On 1 September 2020 Kathy Crewe-Read, formerly head of Wolverhampton Grammar School, became the first woman to lead the school and only the tenth head in its 152-year history.

College heads 
In its first century, the college had just five headmasters.

 1868–1899: Rev Richard Alliott 
 1900–1931: Francis S Young  
 1932–1943: H Leo Price 
 1944–1957: AN Evans 
 1957–1970: Peter Rowe 
 1970–1984: Colin Greetham  
 1984–1997: Stephen George Garnett Benson  
 1997–2011: John Trotman  
 2011–2020: Jeremy Gladwin  
 2020–present: Kathy Crewe-Read

Present day 
There are 1,213 pupils at Bishop's Stortford College: 580 in the Senior School (aged 13–18), including 238 in the Sixth Form, 505 in the Prep School (aged 7–13) and 128 in Pre-Prep (aged 4–7). Pupils board from the age of seven. The Senior School has 111 boarders, including full, weekly and part-time; the Prep School has 26 full, weekly or flexi-boarders. Most UK boarders come from Hertfordshire, Cambridgeshire, Essex and London, while most international boarders are Senior School pupils.

In 2020, the college produced its best-ever GCSE results, with 79% of all grades at 9-7 (up from 76% in 2019). At A Level, students achieved a 100% pass rate in 2020, with 86% of results graded A*-B and 62% at A*-A. Most students go on to study at Russell Group universities, including Oxford and Cambridge.

The latest ISI Education Quality Inspection report, published in March 2017, found that "the quality of the pupils' academic and other achievements is excellent", with pupils displaying "excellent attitudes towards their learning and highly developed study skills". The report also stated that "the school is highly successful in creating an ethic of hard work and enthusiastic participation".

The college maintains a Christian ethos but promotes matters of faith from a non-denominational perspective that is sensitive towards pupils of other faiths and none. Morning assemblies are led by the head and the school chaplain, with an evening service for boarders every Sunday and a weekly prayer breakfast for staff on Wednesday mornings.

Since 2009 it has hosted an annual Festival of Literature, which is open to the public and includes events for local primary schools. Speakers and performers have included Poet Laureate Simon Armitage, former Children's Laureate Anthony Browne, broadcasters Robin Ince and Michael Portillo, author and illustrator James Mayhew, art critic Andrew Graham-Dixon and the bestselling novelist Rachel Joyce. Due to the COVID-19 pandemic restrictions, the 2021 festival was a virtual event.

Houses 
The college has 14 houses, all named after prominent figures in its history. Each of the six, single-sex day houses in the Senior School is in the care of a housemaster or housemistress, while the five boarding houses all have resident house parents, a resident assistant and other resident staff.

Prep School pupils are split into four houses for competitions: Monk-Jones, Newbury, Westfield and Grimwade, but the latter is the only bricks and mortar house and is home to the boarders.

The Senior School has five houses for boys – Collett, Hayward and Sutton for day boys, and Robert Pearce and Rowe for boys' boarding; and five houses for girls – Alliott, Benson and Tee for day girls, and Trotman and Young for girls' boarding.

College facilities 
The FS Young Library was built in 1936 as a permanent memorial to FS Young, college headmaster from 1900 to 1931. Since 1992 it has been run by qualified librarians and is fully supervised for 70 hours a week to provide research and study facilities and assistance for pupils and staff. It is also home to an extensive archive of college records, publications, photographs, cuttings, and memorabilia including old uniforms from the college's early days.

Sports facilities include a sports hall, fitness centre and indoor pool, officially opened in 2002 by Olympian swimmer Duncan Goodhew. The playing fields cover more than 100 acres, including twelve rugby pitches, seven cricket squares and sixteen cricket nets, three grass hockey pitches, five football pitches and a grass running track. There are also two floodlit AstroTurf hockey pitches hockey, all-weather surface courts for netball and tennis and a multi-use games area.

The college has been included in The Cricketer magazine's guide to cricket's top 100 schools in England since 2017 and the Prep School is in the top 50 for the first time in the 2021 edition. In 2020 it became an MCC Foundation Cricket Hub, providing free cricketing facilities and coaching to state-educated young cricketers.

The Grade II listed Memorial Hall has been used for assemblies, concerts and special events since it was formally opened in 1922 by Sir Arthur Quiller-Couch. Designed by architect Bertram Clough Williams-Ellis (creator of the Italianate village of Portmeirion in North Wales), it was built to commemorate the 62 former college boys who had died in the First World War. The doors were given in memory of EA Knight, a popular master killed on active service in Belgium in 1917. A second Roll of Honour was added in 1949, inscribed with the names of a further 92 former students who died while serving in the Second World War. Wooden chairs in the hall had names individually carved for dedication.

The Ferguson Building, opened in 2007 and named after Old Stortfordian Professor John Ferguson, who was a founding member of the Open University, provides a lecture theatre for up to 180 people, meeting room, ICT suite and sixth form social centre. It is built on the site of the old indoor swimming pool and retains some of its original features. It hosts the Ferguson Lectures, which focus on contemporary issues and are open to the public; speakers have included former archbishop of Canterbury Dr Rowan Williams; Jason Cowley, editor of the New Statesman; Brendan Simms, Professor of History of International Relations at Peterhouse, Cambridge; Jonathan Bartley, co-leader of the Green Party of England and Wales; the late Tony Benn, politician; and writer and historian Tom Holland.

Other facilities include the purpose-built Charles Edwards Centre, which houses ICT, physics and design and technology, and the Walter Strachan Art Centre, which has a sculpture studio, workshop, gallery space, IT suite, sixth form studio and departmental library.

Notable Old Stortfordians 

Former pupils are known as Old Stortfordians. For a more complete list, see People educated at Bishop's Stortford College.

Sir Leonard Pearce (1873–1947), electrical engineer, designer of Battersea Power Station
Grantly Dick-Read (1890–1959), obstetrician, pioneer of natural childbirth
Lieutenant-Colonel Sir Brett Cloutman (1891–1971) VC, MC, KC, awarded the last Victoria Cross of the First World War 
Wilfred Bion (1897–1979), psychoanalyst, president of the British Psychoanalytical Society, 1962–65
Malcolm Nokes (1897–1986) MC, Olympic medalist, teacher, soldier, chemist, nuclear scientist
H Leo Price (1899–1943), hockey and rugby international, Bishop's Stortford College headmaster, 1932–1943
Clifford Dupont (1905–1978), first President of Rhodesia
Leader Stirling (1906–2003), missionary surgeon, Health Minister of Tanzania, 1975–1980
Sir Dick White (1906–1993), KBE, Director-General of MI5, 1953–1956, Chief of MI6, 1956–1968
Alec Clifton-Taylor (1907–1985), architectural historian
Edward Crankshaw (1909–1984), expert and author on the Soviet Union and the Gestapo
John Glyn-Jones (1909–1997), actor
Roger Hilton (1911–1975), painter, pioneer of abstract art
Denis Greenhill, Baron Greenhill of Harrow (1913–2000), GCMG, Permanent Under-Secretary of the Foreign and Commonwealth Office and Head of the Diplomatic Service, 1969–1973
Peter Wright (1916–1995), Assistant Director-General of MI5 and author of Spycatcher
Sir Arthur Bonsall (born 1917), KCMG, Director of GCHQ, 1973–1978
Leslie McLean (1918–1987), cricketer
General Sir Peter Whiteley (1920–2016), GCB, OBE, Commander-in-Chief of the Allied Forces in Northern Europe (1977-1979)
Drummond Allison (1921–1943), Second World War poet
Professor John Ferguson (1921–1989), Christian pacifist, first Dean of Arts at the Open University
John Rae (1931–2006), author, headmaster of Westminster School, 1970–1986
CIM Jones (1934–2016), Olympic hockey player (1960, 1964) and coach, Hertfordshire cricketer, college head of geography 1960–1970, Headmaster of Bedford School
Dick Clement (born 1937), OBE, television and screenwriter
John Heddle (1943–1989), politician
John Richard Patterson (1945–1997), founder of the Dateline computer dating service
Sir Stephen Lander (born 1947), KCB, Director-General of MI5, 1996–2002, and Chair of the Serious Organised Crime Agency, 2004–2009
Robert Kirby (1948–2009), arranger, best known for his work with Nick Drake
Andy Peebles (born 1948), broadcaster
Alan Lyddiard (born Michael Kent, 1949), theatre and film director
Bill Sharpe (born 1952), keyboardist and founding member of jazz-funk band Shakatak
James Duthie (born 1957), hockey player and Great Britain team coach
James Baxter (born 1967), British animator
Guy Wilkinson  (born 1968), professor of physics at the University of Oxford
Ben Clarke (born 1968), England rugby union player (1992–1999)
Alastair Lukies (born 1973), entrepreneur and co-founder of Monitise 
Iain Mackay (born 1985), hockey international, Olympian
Charli XCX (Charlotte Aitchison; born 1992), multi-award-winning singer-songwriter
Elinah Phillip (born 2000), Olympic swimmer

Notable teachers have included:
Percy Horton (1897–1970), painter, College art master 1925–1930
Herbert Sumsion (1899–1995), Organist of Gloucester Cathedral, College director of music 1924–1926
Viscount Bracken (1901–1958), publisher, politician, First Lord of the Admiralty, College master c.1920–1922
Bernie Cotton MBE (born 1948), England and Great Britain hockey player and coach, college geography master 1960s, 1970s, 1990s

References

Further reading 

 John Morley and Norman Monk-Jones (1969), Bishop's Stortford College 1868-1968 Centenary Chronicle (JM Dent & Sons Ltd, London)
 John Ferguson (1970), Cricket at Bishop's Stortford College Essex 1868-1968
 Bob Kisby (2017), Bishop's Stortford College 1968-2018: Fifty Years On
 Bishop's Stortford College (2018), Bishop's Stortford College: Celebrating 150 Years 1868-2018

External links

Bishop's Stortford College Prospectus: History
Profile in the Good Schools Guide
Independent Schools Inspectorate (ISI) reports
The Cricketer Schools Guide 2020

Educational institutions established in 1868
Private schools in Hertfordshire
Member schools of the Headmasters' and Headmistresses' Conference
Boarding schools in Hertfordshire
1868 establishments in England

Bishop's Stortford